John D. Schneider (March 1, 1937 – March 2, 2017) was an American lawyer and politician.

He was elected to the Missouri House of Representatives in 1968, and served until 1970, when he ran for a seat on the Missouri State Senate. Schneider stepped down at the end of his term in 2002 and returned to his private law practice.

Born in St. Louis, Missouri, Schneider received his bachelor's and law degrees from Saint Louis University.
He was married to Mary Schneider, with whom he had four children. He died at his home in Warson Woods, Missouri on March 2, 2017, at the age of 80.

References

1937 births
2017 deaths
Politicians from St. Louis
Saint Louis University alumni
Democratic Party Missouri state senators
Democratic Party members of the Missouri House of Representatives
Missouri lawyers
20th-century American lawyers